I Love a Mystery is a 1945 American mystery film directed by Henry Levin and starring Jim Bannon, Nina Foch, George Macready, and Barton Yarborough. Based on Carlton E. Morse's popular radio serial of the same name, I Love a Mystery was the first of three Columbia "B" pictures inspired by the radio series and the only one actually based on a script written by Morse for the radio series. The Devil's Mask and The Unknown followed in 1946.

Plot
Two private detectives, Jim Packard (Jim Bannon) and Doc Long (Barton Yarborough), make the uneasy acquaintance of Jefferson Monk (George Macready) at a nightclub. When a flaming dessert is nearly spilled onto the trio, Monk reveals it was meant for him. He explains that, according to a prophecy, he is to die in three days. Upon learning their profession, Monk hires the two for protection, particularly from a hideous, peg-legged horror who stalks the streets, toting a valise, supposedly to use in transporting Monk's severed head to an ancient secret society. When Packard and Doc trail Monk and a woman companion outside the nightclub, the one-legged man appears, but he eludes capture.

Eventually, Packard comes to suspect someone is trying to drive Monk to suicide. He has learned Monk's two-million dollar inheritance will go to charity instead of to his wife Ellen should he divorce her (Nina Foch). Since Mrs. Monk has the most to gain from Monk's demise, it is assumed she is the person behind the conspiracy. In the end, Packard discovers Monk has begun killing off his wife's fellow conspirators, one by one, including the one-legged stalker. Later Monk presumes Packard and Long have figured all this out. He thus decides to kill them. However, the detectives foil his scheme, and Monk is forced to flee in his car. He loses control of the speeding auto and is involved in a collision. Ironically, this results in his own decapitation.

Cast
 Jim Bannon as Jack Packard
 Nina Foch as Ellen Monk
 George Macready as Jefferson Monk
 Barton Yarborough as Doc Long
 Carole Mathews as Jean Anderson
 Lester Matthews as Justin Reeves / Mr. Gee

References

External links 
 
 
 
 

American mystery films
American black-and-white films
Films directed by Henry Levin
Columbia Pictures films
1945 mystery films
1945 films
1940s American films
1940s English-language films